Company Sergeant Major Ivor Rees VC (18 October 1893 – 11 March 1967) was a Welsh recipient of the Victoria Cross, the highest and most prestigious award for gallantry in the face of the enemy that can be awarded to members of the British and Commonwealth forces.

Details
Rees was born at Felinfoel. He enlisted into the 11th Battalion, South Wales Borderers, part of the 115th Brigade, 38th (Welsh) Division. Rees survived the fighting at Mametz Wood, and moved with the Division to Ypres. At Ypres, the Battalion were tasked with the capture of the Pilckem Ridge – a heavily fortified German defensive line during the Battle of Passchendaele.

His citation read:

Later life
During the Second World War, he served as a Company Sergeant-Major in the Home Guard. Rees died on 12 March 1967 at Llanelli, Carmarthenshire, Wales.

Legacy
Rees is remembered on memorials in Havard Chapel, Brecon Cathedral and at Llanelli Town Hall, Carmarthenshire.

His Victoria Cross is owned by the Regimental Museum of The Royal Welsh, Brecon, Powys, Wales.

References

Monuments to Courage (David Harvey, 1999)
The Register of the Victoria Cross (This England, 1997)
VCs of the First World War: Passchendaele 1917 (Stephen Snelling, 1998)

External links
Location of grave and VC medal (West Glamorgan, Wales)

Blue Plaque in home town of Llanelli (Llanelli Community Heritage)

1893 births
1967 deaths
Military personnel from Carmarthenshire
People from Carmarthenshire
British World War I recipients of the Victoria Cross
South Wales Borderers soldiers
British Home Guard soldiers
British Army personnel of World War I
British Army personnel of World War II
British Army recipients of the Victoria Cross
Welsh recipients of the Victoria Cross